"An Inconvenient Lie" is the third episode of the second season and fifteenth overall episode of the American television drama series Dexter, which first aired on October 14, 2007 on Showtime in the United States. The episode was written by Melissa Rosenberg and was directed by Tony Goldwyn.

Plot

Rita threatens to leave Dexter if he does not commit to a program to deal with his drug addiction. He starts attending Narcotics Anonymous meetings, while still trying to evade Doakes' constant surveillance. At the meeting, Dexter meets a mysterious and flirtatious woman named Lila (Jaime Murray), who volunteers to be his sponsor. Doakes tracks Dexter at the meeting, but to Dexter's relief, Doakes displays understanding of the "addiction" and lets Dexter go. Later, he hunts down a new victim, Roger Hicks (Don McManus), a used-car salesman who murders beautiful brunettes. Lundy invites Debra to join the new task force investigating the Bay Harbor Butcher, and soon discovers a pattern to the murders.

Production
Filming locations for the episode included Miami, Florida, as well as Marina del Rey, California.

Reception

The episode was positively received. IGN's Eric Goldman gave the episode a rating of 8.5 out of 10, and commented that "Overall though, this is a very good and pretty notable episode of Dexter". The A.V. Club critic Scott Tobias gave the episode an A− grade and stated that it "the best episode of the season so far, he continues to make remarkable progress in understanding and acknowledging that maybe he really does care about the people close to him. [...] Having our hero stuck in a confusing no man’s land between having a genuine conscience and following the urgings of his inner “dark passenger” has made him a much richer character than he might have been had he merely backslid into a cold, thoughtless killer again. I was worried the show would go soft as Dexter became more human, but that kind of progress is a littered with obstacles, and this season is turning into a very bumpy ride indeed."

References

External links

 
 "An Inconvenient Lie" at Showtime's website

2007 American television episodes
Dexter (TV series) episodes